In formal language theory and computer science, a substring is a contiguous sequence of characters within a string. For instance, "the best of" is a substring of "It was the best of times". In contrast, "Itwastimes" is a subsequence of "It was the best of times", but not a substring.

Prefixes and suffixes are special cases of substrings.

The substrings of the string "apple" would be:
"a", "ap", "app", "appl", "apple",
"p", "pp", "ppl", "pple",
"pl", "ple",
"l", "le"
"e", "" 
(note the empty string at the end).

Substring 

A string  is a substring (or factor) of a string  if there exists two strings  and  such that . In particular, the empty string is a substring of every string.

Example: The string ana is equal to substrings (and subsequences) of banana at two different offsets:

 banana
  |||||
  ana||
    |||
    ana

The first occurrence is obtained with b and na, while the second occurrence is obtained with  ban and  being the empty string.

A substring of a string is a prefix of a suffix of the string, and equivalently a suffix of a prefix; for example, nan is a prefix of nana, which is in turn a suffix of banana. The occurrences of a given pattern in a given string can be found with a string searching algorithm. Finding the longest string which is equal to a substring of two or more strings is known as the longest common substring problem.
In the mathematical literature, substrings are also called subwords (in America) or factors (in Europe).

Prefix 

A string  is a prefix of a string  if there exists a string  such that . A proper prefix of a string is not equal to the string itself; some sources in addition restrict a proper prefix to be non-empty. A prefix can be seen as a special case of a substring.

Example: The string ban is equal to a prefix (and substring and subsequence) of the string banana:

 banana
 |||
 ban

This defines a binary relation on strings, called the prefix relation, which is a particular kind of prefix order.

Suffix 

A string  is a suffix of a string  if there exists a string  such that . A proper suffix of a string is not equal to the string itself. A more restricted interpretation is that it is also not empty. A suffix can be seen as a special case of a substring.

Example: The string nana is equal to a suffix (and substring and subsequence) of the string banana:

 banana
   ||||
   nana

A suffix tree for a string is a trie data structure that represents all of its suffixes. Suffix trees have large numbers of applications in string algorithms. The suffix array is a simplified version of this data structure that lists the start positions of the suffixes in alphabetically sorted order; it has many of the same applications.

Border 

A border is suffix and prefix of the same string, e.g. "bab" is a border of "babab" (and also of "baboon eating a kebab").

Superstring 

Finding superstrings whose length is as small as possible is a more interesting problem. 

A string that contains every possible permutation of a specified character set is called a superpermutation.

See also 
 Brace notation
 Substring index
 Suffix automaton

References

String (computer science)
Formal languages